The Strawberry Roan is a 1948 American Western film directed by John English and starring Gene Autry.

Plot
Joe is paralyzed by a wild horse, a strawberry roan. His father, Walt, tries to kill the horse in anger but is unsuccessful and the horse escapes. Autry, who stopped Walt from killing the animal, is asked to leave the ranch. He finds the horse and trains it in the hopes of returning it to Joe to give him the will to overcome his disability.

Cast
 Gene Autry as Gene Autry
 Gloria Henry as Connie Bailey
 Jack Holt as Walt Bailey
 Dickie Jones as Joe Bailey
 Pat Buttram as Hank
 Rufe Davis as Chuck
 John McGuire as Bud Williams
 Eddy Waller as Steve
 Redd Harper as Andy
 Champion as Champ, the Strawberry Roan

Production

Stuntwork
 Ted Mapes
 Eddie Parker

Filming locations
 Santa Clarita, California, USA
 Andy Jauregui Ranch, Placerita Canyon Road, Newhall, California, USA
 Sedona, Arizona, USA

Soundtrack
 "The Strawberry Roan" (Curley Fletcher) by Gene Autry
 "Texas Sandman" (Allan Roberts, Doris Fisher) by Gene Autry
 "The Angel Song (When the Angels turn the lights on in Heaven)" (Gene Austin, Curt Massey, Mary Millard) by Gene Autry
 "Can't Shake the Sands of Texas From My Shoes" (Gene Austin, Kenneth Pitts, Diane Johnston) by Gene Autry
 "When the White Roses Bloom in Red River Valley" by Gene Autry

References
Citations

Bibliography

External links
 
 
 

1948 films
1948 Western (genre) films
Cinecolor films
Films about horses
Columbia Pictures films
Films with screenplays by Dorothy Yost
Films directed by John English
American Western (genre) films
1940s English-language films
1940s American films